The 2019–20 season is Mitre's 3rd consecutive season in the second division of Argentine football. In addition to Primera B Nacional, the club are competing in the Copa Argentina.

The season generally covers the period from 1 July 2019 to 30 June 2020.

Review

Pre-season
Three departures were confirmed before any signings were made, as Martín Perafán's departure to Agropecuario on 6 June was followed by Lucas Pérez Godoy and Franco Ferrari leaving on 10/20 June for Deportivo Morón and Volos respectively. Exequiel Beltramone agreed a loan in from Talleres on 24 June. On 25 June, Mitre announced a double signing in Lucas Márquez (Gimnasia y Esgrima (M) and Leandro Lencinas (Godoy Cruz). Agustín Verdugo also made a move from Godoy Cruz twenty-four hours later. Ariel Coronel departed to Atlanta on 27 June. Across the subsequent three days, the arrivals of Diego Auzqui, Rodrigo López, Jorge Scolari and Guillermo Farré were made final; the latter on 30 June, the same time Román Strada penned terms with Santamarina.

All loans from 2018 to 2019 officially ended on/around 30 June. Juan Manuel Marital, Ángel Piz and Lucas Ceballos all joined on 1 July, as Brian Mieres struck a deal with Chacarita Juniors. One in and one out occurred on 2 July, with Norberto Paparatto going to Almagro and Luis Ojeda coming from Ascenso MX's Cafetaleros de Tapachula. Joaquín Quinteros left to Atlético de Rafaela on 3 July. Mitre's twelfth new addition was revealed on 5 July, as forward Iván Escobares came from Juventud Unida Universitario. Guillermo Vernetti went to Defensores de Belgrano (BA). Adrián Toloza arrived from Mexican side Celaya on 6 July. The incomings of David Valdez and Mauro Maidana from San Jorge and Argentinos Juniors were communicated on 9 July.

Mitre drew (1–1) and then beat (4–0) Vélez Sarsfield in friendlies on 10 July. Felipe Cadenazzi signed for Brown on 10 July. A friendly with Argentinos Juniors for 13 July was cancelled. Leonardo Valdez and Marcos Rivadero were officialized as new players on 15 July, as was Marcos Figueroa on 17 July.

July
Mitre were eliminated from the 2018–19 Copa Argentina on 20 July, as Estudiantes (LP) of the Primera División defeated them after goals from Matías Pellegrini and Federico González. A loan move for Nicolás Temperini, from Newell's Old Boys, was completed on 22 July. 26 July saw Mitre and San Martín (T) meet in friendlies, as they shared wins in San Miguel de Tucumán. Luca Falabella arrived on loan from Argentinos Juniors on 30 July, on the same date that Mitre agreed a deal for Alejandro Rébola; subject to terms.

August
Rébola officially joined from Mushuc Runa on 1 August, with Rodrigo Sayavedra (Argentino) following a day later. Belgrano were beaten in an exhibition encounter away on 3 August, though Mitre lost the day's other fixture 4–0. Mitre's fourth pre-season match was played on 8 August, as they were defeated consecutively by Primera División team Atlético Tucumán. On 14 August, Argentino announced a loan deal had been agreed with Mitre for Gabriel Tellas; Mitre confirmed it hours later, though it was still to be finalised contractually. The club opened their Primera B Nacional campaign with a loss on 16 August, as Estudiantes (BA) beat them after a goal from Francisco González Metilli. Mitre lost again in game two, falling to defeat in Buenos Aires to Atlanta on 24 August.

September
Mitre began September as they ended August - with a loss, as San Martín (SJ)'s Marcos Gelabert netted a ninety-fifth-minute winner.

Squad

Transfers
Domestic transfer windows:3 July 2019 to 24 September 201920 January 2020 to 19 February 2020.

Transfers in

Transfers out

Loans in

Friendlies

Pre-season
A friendly fixture with Argentinos Juniors was scheduled for 13 July. Vélez Sarsfield, San Martín (T), Belgrano and Atlético Tucumán were all pre-season opponents for Mitre.

Competitions

Primera B Nacional

Results summary

Matches
The fixtures for the 2019–20 league season were announced on 1 August 2019, with a new format of split zones being introduced. Mitre were drawn in Zone A.

Copa Argentina

Mitre were drawn to face Primera División outfit Estudiantes (LP) in the round of thirty-two in the Copa Argentina, with the fixture taking place at the neutral venue of Cutral Có's Estadio Coloso del Ruca Quimey.

Squad statistics

Appearances and goals

Statistics accurate as of 3 September 2019.

Notes

References

Club Atlético Mitre seasons
Mitre